Grevillea irrasa is a species of flowering plant in the family Proteaceae and is endemic to south-eastern New South Wales. It is an erect, spreading shrub with oblong to egg-shaped leaves with the narrower end towards the base, and clusters of red to apricot-coloured flowers.

Description

Taxonomy
Grevillea irrasa was first formally described in 2000 by Australian botanist Robert Owen Makinson in the Flora of Australia from specimens collected in the Nullica State Forest in 1997. The specific epithet (irrasa) means "unpolished" or "unshaven" and refers to the surface of the leaves, branchlets and flowers.

In the same publication, Makinson described two subspecies of G. irrasa and the names are accepted by the Australian Plant Census:
Grevillea irrasa subsp. didymochiton Makinson has leaves that are egg-shaped or lance-shaped with the narrower end towards the base, or elliptic or oblong, and five to seven times as long as broad;
Grevillea irrasa subsp. irrasa Makinson has leaves that are narrowly oblong to lance-shaped with the narrower end towards the base, and five to ten times as long as broad.

Distribution and habitat
Grevillea irrasa occurs in dry sclerophyll forest inland from Pambula and Moruya in the south-east of New South Wales.

References

irrasa
Flora of New South Wales
Proteales of Australia
Taxa named by Robert Owen Makinson